Ticket to Paradise is a 2011 Cuban drama film written and directed by Gerardo Chijona. In 2011 Ticket to Paradise won the Havana Star Prize for Best Film (Fiction) at the 12th annual Havana Film Festival New York.

Cast
 Miriel Cejas as Eunice
 Héctor Medina as Alejandro
 Dunia Hernandez as Lidia
 Jorge Perugorría as Rensoli
 Saray Vargas as Yusmary

References

External links
 

2011 films
2011 drama films
Punk films
2010s Spanish-language films
Cuban drama films